Business as Usual is the third album by hip hop duo EPMD. It was released on December 18, 1990, and was their first on Def Jam, after being signed (along with Nice & Smooth) from their former label, Fresh Records.  It was also the first release under Def Jam's new Rush subsidiary, which allowed founder Russell Simmons more control and more ownership over its material, as the masters for proper Def Jam releases at that time were primarily owned by Sony Music's Columbia Records.

Business as Usual was not as acclaimed as the group's first two albums. The album featured the debut of future hip hop star Redman, who appears on the tracks "Hardcore" and "Brothers on My Jock." Three singles were released from the album: "Gold Digger," "Rampage (Slow Down, Baby)," featuring LL Cool J, and "Give the People." In 1998, the album was selected as one of The Source'''s 100 Best Rap Albums.

Front cover features art from famed American artist Bill Sienkiewicz.

The album was certified Gold by the RIAA on May 7, 1991.

Critical reception
The Los Angeles Times'' wrote that "EPMD could be the most underrated group in hip-hop, pumping direct, honest, simple B-boy rhymes over slow, deadly, bass-heavy beats, pretty much defining the New York rap sound."

Track listing

Charts

Certifications

See also
List of number-one R&B albums of 1991 (U.S.)

Notes

1991 albums
Columbia Records albums
EPMD albums
Def Jam Recordings albums
Albums produced by DJ Scratch
Albums produced by Erick Sermon